Blessing is an historical community in the southern portion of Black Hawk County, Iowa, United States.

History
Blessing was named after James J. Blessington.   

In 1882 a Roman Catholic church was built in Blessing by Fr. O'Brien, resident priest at Eagle Center.  The Church was attached to Eagle Center as a mission until 1892, when Fr. Sheehy arrived as a resident pastor. The use of the church as a Roman Catholic parish was discontinued, however Blessing Cemetery remains an active cemetery.

Blessing's population was 25 in 1902.

References 

Unincorporated communities in Black Hawk County, Iowa